Feyzabad (also Romanized as Feyẕābād) is a village in Khosrow Shirin Rural District, in the Central District of Eqlid County, Fars Province, Iran. At the 2006 census, its population was 195, in 43 families.

References 

Populated places in Eqlid County